Football Club Féminin Hénin-Beaumont is a French women's football club based in Hénin-Beaumont. The club was founded on 12 May 1972 and currently play in the Division 1 Féminine having finished 7th in the 2009–10 season. In 2010, Hénin-Beaumont moved to the Stade Octave Birembaut, 3,000 capacity stadium in the commune, where the club will play its home matches for the 2010–11 season. Previously, the club played its matches at the Stade Raymonde Delabre.

Hénin-Beaumont is managed by Philippe Piette, a former football player, who had a professional career from 1973–1990. Piette had notable club stints at Valenciennes, Metz, and Nancy. Hénin-Beaumont is captained by former French youth international defender Gwendoline Rossi. Rossi has played at senior level for the club since she was 16 years old.

Players

Current squad
Updated 26 November 2009.

Former notable players

 Sandrine Capy
 Amélie Coquet
 Pauline Crammer 
 Severine Goulois 
 Amandine Henry
 Candie Herbert 
 Julie Soyer

Honours

Official
 Division 2 Féminine:
 Winners (2): 2002–03, 2012–13

Invitational
 Menton Tournament:
 Winners (1): 2002

External links
 Official website 

Women's football clubs in France
Association football clubs established in 1972
1972 establishments in France
Division 1 Féminine clubs
Sport in Pas-de-Calais
Football clubs in Hauts-de-France